Talponia is a genus of moths belonging to the family Tortricidae.

Species
Talponia batesi Heinrich, 1932
Talponia plummeriana (Busck, 1906)

See also
List of Tortricidae genera

References

External links
tortricidae.com

Grapholitini
Tortricidae genera